The Bay of Jorge Cárdenas is a shallow bay on Cuba's northern shore, in the province of Matanzas.

Overview
To the north-east it is flanked by cays of the Sabana-Camaguey Archipelago, such as Cayo Cruz del Padre, Cayo Galindo and Cayo Cinco Leguas. To the south-east it is bordered by the coastal wetlands and mangroves of Martí as well as the Bay of Santa Clara. The port and the city of Cárdenas are located on the south-eastern shore. An artificial navigation channel (Kawama Channel) connects the bay to the Straits of Florida south of the town of Varadero.

Other than the industrial port of Cardenas, other marinas lining the bay are located at Siguapa and Júcaro. The waters of the bay are also used for fishing lobster. On the southern shore, a combination of cays (Cayo Cupey) and causeways is used for oil extraction.

The bay was the stage of the Battle of Cárdenas on May 11, 1898, during the Spanish–American War.

References

External links

Cardenas
Cárdenas, Cuba
Geography of Matanzas Province